Detained may refer to Detention (imprisonment)

Detained (1924 film), a 1924 silent starring Stan Laurel
Detained (upcoming film), an upcoming film starring Abbie Cornish
"Detained" (Star Trek: Enterprise), an episode of Star Trek: Enterprise
Detained (novel), a 2015 novel by Don Brown
"Detained" (Class), an episode of the first series of Class

See also
Detention (disambiguation)